The statue of Arnold Schwarzenegger is installed in Columbus, Ohio, United States. The bronze sculpture was originally installed outside the Franklin County Veterans Memorial in 2012, before being relocated and rededicated outside the Greater Columbus Convention Center in 2014. Schwarzenegger, Governor John Kasich, and Columbus Mayor Michael B. Coleman attended the ceremony.

See also
 Arnold Sports Festival, an event hosted at the convention center

References

External links
 
 Columbus, Ohio: Statue of Arnold Schwarzenegger at Roadside America

2012 establishments in Ohio
2012 sculptures
Bronze sculptures in Ohio
Cultural depictions of Arnold Schwarzenegger
Monuments and memorials in Ohio
Outdoor sculptures in Columbus, Ohio
Portraits of actors
Sculptures of men in Ohio
Statues in Columbus, Ohio